Rolf Reikvam (born 12 March 1948 in Førde) is a Norwegian politician for the Socialist Left Party (SV). He was elected to the Norwegian Parliament from Akershus in 1997.

He was a member of the Akershus county council from 1987 to 1997.

Parliamentary Presidium duties 
2005–2009 secretary of the Lagting.

Parliamentary Committee duties 
2005–2009 member of the Electoral Committee.
2005–2009 member of the Fullmaktskomiteen.
2005–2009 member of the Standing Committee on Education, Research and Church Affairs.
2001–2005 member of the Fullmaktskomiteen.
2001–2005 leader of the Standing Committee on Education, Research and Church Affairs.
1997–2001 member of the Standing Committee on Education, Research and Church Affairs.

External links 

Socialist Left Party (Norway) politicians
Members of the Storting
1948 births
Living people
People from Førde
21st-century Norwegian politicians
20th-century Norwegian politicians